Daphnella proxima is a species of sea snail, a marine gastropod mollusk in the family Raphitomidae.

Description
The length of this shell attains 38 mm. The shell is a long spiral.

Distribution
This marine species occurs in the East China Sea. They have been found along  the Japanese coast in places like Okinawa.

References

  Oyama, K., Y. Takemura et al.  1958 The molluscan shells. Tokyo 1: 61

External links
 

proxima
Gastropods described in 1958